Acanthomyrmex basispinosus is a species of ant of the genus Acanthomyrmex. It was described by Moffett in 1986, and is found in Indonesia.

References

External links
 

basispinosus
Insects described in 1986
Insects of Indonesia